Asadullah (born 10 March 1999) is a Pakistani cricketer. He made his List A debut for National Bank of Pakistan in the 2016–17 Departmental One Day Cup on 19 December 2016.

References

External links
 

1999 births
Living people
Pakistani cricketers
National Bank of Pakistan cricketers
Cricketers from Karachi